Polymedium or Polymedion, also known as Palamedium or Polymedia, was a small town in ancient Aeolis , between the promontory Lectum and Assus, and at a distance of 40 stadia from the former.

Its site is located near Asarlık, Asiatic Turkey.

References

 Topoi Text

Populated places in ancient Aeolis
Populated places in ancient Troad
Former populated places in Turkey